Maiden Castle by John Cowper Powys was first published in 1936 and is the last of Powys so-called Wessex novels, following Wolf Solent (1929), A Glastonbury Romance (1932), Weymouth Sands (1934). Powys was an admirer of Thomas Hardy, and these novels are set in Somerset and Dorset, part of Hardy's mythical Wessex. American scholar Richard Maxwell describes these four novels "as remarkably successful with the reading public of his time". Maiden Castle is set in Dorchester, Dorset Thomas Hardy's Casterbridge, and which Powys intended to be a "rival" to Hardy's Mayor of Casterbridge. Glen Cavaliero describes Dorchester as "vividly present throughout the book as a symbol of the continuity of civilization. The title alludes to the Iron Age, hill fort Maiden Castle that stands near to Dorchester.
 
Powys, along with Phyllis Playter, returned permanently to England in June 1934 and, while staying near the village of Chaldon, Dorset, Powys began Maiden Castle in late August 1934, Glen Cavaliero also recognises that much of this novel is "implausible", but he suggests that "it takes on a hypnotic reality in the encounters between its leading characters", and he also comments, that though Uryen's "mad quest may have its ludicrous side", he "remains an impressive haunting figure". Cavaliero also describes it as "perhaps the most Powysian of all the novels".

Bibliography
Cavaliero, Glen. John Cowper Powys, Novelist. Oxford: Clarendon Press, 1973, pp. 93–102
Christensen, Peter G. The "Dark Gods" and Modern Society: Maiden Castle and The Plumed Serpent, in In the Spirit of Powys: New Essays, ed. Denis Lane. Cranbury, NJ: Associated University Presses, 1990, pp. 157–179.
Humfrey, Belinda, ed.The Powys Review. Index to critical articles and other material (including articles by Ian Hughes in nos, 12 and 15): 
Keith, W. J. "Three personal readings of Maiden Castle" 
Knight, G. Wilson. The Saturnian Quest. London: Methuen,1964, pp. 47–55, 77–80.
Krissdottir, Morine. Descents of Memory: The Life of John Cowper Powys. New York: Overlook Duckworth, 2007, pp. 312–321
Lock, Charles, ed. The  Powys Journal. Another source for critical articles. 
Moran, Margaret. "Animated Fictions in Maiden Castle", in In the Spirit of Powys: New Essays, ed. Denis Lane. (Cranbury, NJ: Associated University Presses, 1990), pp. 180–192.
Nodius, Janina.  "I Am Myself Alone": Solitude and Transcendence in John Cowper Powys. Goteborg, Sweden, University of Goteborg, 1997,  pp. 135–170.

See also
John Cowper Powys: 
Autobiography
Owen Glendower
Porius: A Romance of the Dark Ages

References

Modernist novels
1936 British novels
Works by John Cowper Powys
Novels set in Dorset
Simon & Schuster books